The Old Lehigh County Courthouse is an historic county courthouse, which is located in Allentown, Pennsylvania. 

It was added to the National Register of Historic Places in 1981.

History and architectural features
The courthouse's original section was built between 1814 and 1819 and was a two-and-one-half-story stone building with a hipped roof.

It was remodeled and enlarged in 1864, in the Italianate style.

An addition on the west was added in between 1880 and 1881, and a second addition was added to its north between 1914 and 1916 in the Beaux-Arts style.

The courthouse is featured on the Lehigh County seal which was introduced in 1944.

In 1981, the Old Lehigh County Courthouse was added to the National Register of Historic Places in 1981.

See also
 List of historic places in Allentown, Pennsylvania
 List of state and county courthouses in Pennsylvania

References

External links

Beaux-Arts architecture in Pennsylvania
Buildings and structures in Allentown, Pennsylvania
County courthouses in Pennsylvania
Courthouses on the National Register of Historic Places in Pennsylvania
Federal architecture in Pennsylvania
Government buildings completed in 1819
Italianate architecture in Pennsylvania
National Register of Historic Places in Lehigh County, Pennsylvania